Dylan Davis Haines Axelrod (born July 30, 1985) is an American former professional baseball pitcher. He played in Major League Baseball (MLB) for the Chicago White Sox and the Cincinnati Reds.

At Santa Barbara High School Axelrod was the 2003 Channel League Most Valuable Player, and First Team All-County. After college, he was drafted in the 30th round of the 2007 MLB Draft by the San Diego Padres. In 2009, he was a Frontier League All Star. In 2011, he was named a AA Southern League All-Star and an MiLB.com 2011 Cincinnati Reds Organization All Star. He has pitched in the major leagues for the Chicago White Sox (2011–13) and the Cincinnati Reds (2014–15).

Early life
Axelrod was born in Santa Barbara, California, to Dennis and Joni Axelrod.

High school and college
He had a 13–1 record his senior year at Santa Barbara High School, where Axelrod was named team Most Valuable Player (MVP). He was 2003 Channel League MVP, and First Team All-County. He was undrafted out of high school. The Santa Barbara Athletic Round Table held inducted Axelrod into its Hall of Fame in 2018.

Axelrod went on to Santa Barbara City College (SBCC). He played college baseball there in 2004 and 2005, had a school-record 117 strikeouts in 2004, and was named Outstanding Pitcher.

After two years at SBCC, Axelrod transferred to University of California, Irvine (UC Irvine), where he played for the Anteaters from 2006 to 2007. He was a reliever with UC Irvine, and was seventh in the Big West Conference in appearances in 2006 with 28 and had a 3–3 record with a 4.59 ERA.

He played for the Santa Barbara Foresters in the California Collegiate League (CCL) during the summer of 2006, and the team won the National Baseball Congress World Series title as he went 5–0 with a 2.01 ERA. He recorded 34 appearances (leading the league) in 2007, and went 6–4 with a 3.96 ERA, striking out 79 in 72.2 innings. In February 2014 he was inducted into the Foresters Hall of Fame.

Axelrod was drafted in the 30th round, 927th overall, of the 2007 MLB Draft by the San Diego Padres.

Minor leagues
Axelrod debuted in 2007 with the Arizona League Padres of the Rookie Arizona League, going 0–2 with 2 saves in 11 games exclusively as a reliever with a 5.40 ERA, before earning a promotion to the Fort Wayne Wizards of the A Midwest League, where in 10 games out of the pen he had a 1.27 ERA.  He started 2008 with the Lake Elsinore Storm of the A+ California League, going 2–1 as a reliever in 32 games with a 5.29 ERA, before being sent back to Fort Wayne, where he finished the year going 1–1 with a 3.95 ERA.

He started 2009 with Lake Elsinore, but after 11 games with a 4.50 ERA Axelrod was cut. He signed with the Windy City ThunderBolts of the Independent Frontier League, where, after he had a 2.21 ERA in 22 games with 6 saves, and being a Frontier League All Star, he drew the attention of the Chicago White Sox, signing a deal on August 2, 2009. When he made it to the major leagues, he became the second Thunderbolt to do so. He pitched for the Kannapolis Intimidators of the A South Atlantic League where, after 2 games, he was promoted to the Winston-Salem Dash of the A+ Carolina League, where he started 5 games and had a 1.91 ERA.

Axelrod started 2010 with Winston-Salem, going 8–3 with a 1.99 ERA in 99.1 innings, and pitched two games for the Birmingham Barons of the AA Southern League.  He started 2011 with Birmingham as their opening day starter, going 3–2 with a 3.34 ERA and was a Southern League All-Star, before being promoted to the Charlotte Knights of the AAA International League, by then a full-time starter, going 6–1 with a 2.27 ERA in 15 starts before being promoted again to the major leagues. Baseball America rated him as having the Best Control in the Chicago White Sox system after the 2010 season.  At the time of his promotion to the major leagues in 2011, he led all White Sox minor leaguers in ERA (2.69), strikeouts (132), and opponents' batting average (.227), and was 9–3. He was named an MiLB.com 2011 Cincinnati Reds Organization All Star.

In 2012 Axelrod pitched 16 starts for Charlotte, going 7–5 with a 2.88 ERA. In 2014, he pitched for both Charlotte and the Louisville Bats, both of the International League, going a combined 8–9 with a 4.01 ERA. He was named International League Pitcher of the Week on August 11, 2014.  During the summer he pitched for the Toros del Este of the Dominican Winter League, going 3–1 with a 3.23 ERA in 7 starts.

In 2015, he pitched again for Louisville, going 6–8 with a 4.68 ERA. In 2016 Axelrod pitched for the New Orleans Zephyrs of the AAA Pacific Coast League, going 9–7 with a 4.48 ERA. On November 7, 2016, he elected to be a free agent.

Major Leagues

Chicago White Sox
On September 5, 2011, Axelrod was promoted to the Chicago White Sox. Tony Peña was transferred to the 60-day DL to make room on the 40-man roster. He made his Major League Baseball debut on September 7, 2011, pitching 2 scoreless innings in relief of starter John Danks in a game the White Sox lost, 5–4, to the Minnesota Twins. Axelrod made his first Major League start a week later, on September 14 vs. the first-place Detroit Tigers, who were on an 11-game win streak. He exited after six innings with a 5–2 lead, after striking out eight Tigers. Unfortunately for Axelrod, the White Sox bullpen blew the lead in the 9th inning and he did not pick up the win. It was announced prior to his start that Axelrod would assume Jake Peavy's place in the White Sox rotation for the remainder of the 2011 season.

Axelrod started two more games in the 2011 season: September 20 against Cleveland, pitching  innings and allowing seven hits and four runs; but was back on form September 26 against Toronto, pitching six shutout innings, allowing three hits while striking out six, and recording his first Major League win. For the season, he was 1-0 for the White Sox with a 2.89 ERA.

Axelrod was 2–2 with a 5.17 ERA in 2012, and struggled in 2013, with a 4–11 record and 5.68 ERA for the White Sox. Among pitchers who threw as many innings or more as Axelrod in 2013, only four had worse ERAs. After the 2013 season, Axelrod was non-tendered by the White Sox, making him a free agent. He was re-signed to a minor league deal on January 9, 2014.

Cincinnati Reds
Axelrod was traded to the Cincinnati Reds on July 17, 2014. He was 2-1 for the Reds in 2014, with a 2.95 ERA, striking out 9.82 batters per nine innings and walking 1.96 batters per nine innings. In 2015, he pitched in half a dozen games for the Reds.

Miami Marlins
On December 11, 2015, Axelrod was signed to a minor-league deal by the Miami Marlins. Pitching for the AAA New Orleans Zephyrs, he was 9–7	with a 4.19	ERA in 25 starts (7th in the league), with a complete game (6th). He elected free agency on November 7, 2016.

World Baseball Classic; Team Israel
Axelrod pitched for Team Israel at the 2017 World Baseball Classic, in March 2017.

Pitching coordinator
In January 2020 Axelrod joined the Los Angeles Angels organization as a Pitching Coordinator.

Scouting report
Axelrod's broad repertoire consists of a four-seam fastball (86–90 mph), a sinker (86–90 mph), a cutter (85–88 mph), a slider (80–83 mph), a curveball (72–76 mph), and a changeup (80–85 mph). The cutter is his least commonly used pitch.

References

External links

1985 births
Living people
Arizona League Padres players
Baseball players from California
Birmingham Barons players
Charlotte Knights players
Chicago White Sox players
Christians from California
Cincinnati Reds players
Fort Wayne Wizards players
Jewish American baseball players
Kannapolis Intimidators players
Lake Elsinore Storm players
Louisville Bats players
Los Angeles Angels personnel
Major League Baseball pitchers
New Orleans Zephyrs players
Santa Barbara City College alumni
Sportspeople from Santa Barbara, California
Sportspeople from Irvine, California
Toros del Este players
American expatriate baseball players in the Dominican Republic
UC Irvine Anteaters baseball players
Windy City ThunderBolts players
Winston-Salem Dash players
2017 World Baseball Classic players
21st-century American Jews